Production and Operations Management is a monthly peer-reviewed academic journal covering research on all aspects of operations management, production management, management science, supply chain management, and manufacturing engineering. It is published by Wiley-Blackwell on behalf of the Production and Operations Management Society. It is listed as one of the 45 journals used by the Financial Times to compile its business-school research ranks and Bloomberg Businessweeks Top 20 Journals.

History
The journal was established by the editor-in-chief, Kalyan Singhal (University of Baltimore).

Abstracting and indexing
The journal is abstracted and indexed in:
Current Contents/Engineering, Computing & Technology
EconLit
EBSCO databases
Inspec
ProQuest databases
Science Citation Index Expanded
Scopus
According to the Journal Citation Reports, the journal has a 2021 impact factor of 4.638.

References

External links

Wiley-Blackwell academic journals
English-language journals
Business and management journals
Monthly journals
Publications established in 1992